WASP-2 is a binary star system in the Delphinus constellation located about 500 light-years away.
The primary is magnitude 12 orange dwarf star, orbited by red dwarf star on wide orbit. The star system shows an infrared excess noise of unknown origin.

Planetary system
This star has one extrasolar planet WASP-2b, detected by the SuperWASP project in 2006.

Binary star
In 2008 a study was undertaken of fourteen stars with exoplanets that were originally discovered using the transit method through relatively small telescopes. These systems were re-examined with the  reflector telescope at the Calar Alto Observatory in Spain. This star system, along with two others, was determined to be a previously unknown binary star system. The previously unknown secondary star is a dim magnitude 15 M-type star separated by about 111 AU from the primary, appearing offset from the primary by about one arc second in the images. This discovery resulted in a recalculation of parameters for both the planet and the primary star.

The re-examination of the WASP-2 spectrum in 2015, have resulted in the measurement of stellar companion temperature equal to 3513 K, and angular separation of 0.73 arc second

See also
 SuperWASP
 WASP-1

Notes

References

External links
 

Delphinus (constellation)
Planetary transit variables
Planetary systems with one confirmed planet
Binary stars
K-type main-sequence stars
2
J20305413+0625463